The 1947 Irish Greyhound Derby took place during July and August with the final being held at Harold's Cross Stadium in Dublin on 15 August 1947. 

The winner Daring Flash won £500 and was owned, bred and trained by Mary d'Arcy from Kilternan and became the first winner to be sired by a previous Derby champion.

Final result 
At Harold's Cross, 15 August (over 525 yards):

Distances 
2, 3 (lengths)

Competition Report
During the second round Faugh A Ballah clocked 29.91, with other fast heat winners being Darcel (30.08), Little Arthurstown (30.12) and Pedlars Pet (30.40).

In the semi-finals Baytown Ivy defeated Paddys Elbow by four lengths in 30.08; Darcel beat Note Him by half a length and the Callanan Cup champion Daring Flash won from Hailes Gate in 30.02, also by half a length.

In the final the track specialist Daring Flash broke well alongside Paddys Elbow and the pair vied for the lead until the latter tired. Note Him ran on well to take third place from Darcel.

See also
1947 UK & Ireland Greyhound Racing Year

References

Greyhound racing in the Republic of Ireland
Irish Greyhound Derby
Irish Greyhound Derby